Inflore is a national level two-day management fest conducted by Rajagiri Centre for Business Studies. Inflore is a combination of management and non-management events. The fest will happen on the RCBS campus, Kakkanad every year with different themes. The Inflore is fully managed by students under the guidance of faculty members.

Inflore 2019 
The 15th edition of Rajagiri Inflore was conducted on 5 & 6 December 2019.

Inflore 2018 
The 14th edition of Rajagiri Inflore was conducted on 5 & 6 October 2018. The theme of Inflore 2018 was 'The Thousand Spotlights'. Christ University won the overall championship. Students of Rajagiri supported the Chendamangalam weavers by selling Chekutty dolls during the two days of Inflore which were made by the students itself.

Inflore 2017 
The 13th edition of Rajagiri Inflore was conducted on 6 and 7 October 2017. The theme of Inflore 2017 was 'The Roar'. The overall championship was won by K.L.E. Society’s College of Business Administration, Lingaraj College, Belgaum.

Inflore 2016 
The 12th edition of Rajagiri Inflore was conducted on 28 and 29 October 2016. The theme of Inflore 2016 was 'That 90’s magic'. The overall championship was won by SCMS Cochin School of Business.

References

External links 
 https://www.facebook.com/rcbsinflore/

Education in Kochi